Baya Mahieddine or Fatima Haddad (born in Bordj El Kiffan  on December 12, 1931; died November 9, 1998) was an Algerian artist. While she did not self-identify as belonging to a particular art genre, critics have classified her paintings as being surrealist, primitive, naïve, and modern. Her works are mainly paintings, though she did pottery as well, all completely self-taught.

At the age of sixteen Baya had her first exhibition, in Paris, where she gained notice from renowned artists such as Picasso and André Breton. Her work was presented in various exhibitions in France and Algeria, and has appeared on Algerian postage stamps.

Life and career
Born in 1931 in Fort de l’eau (today's Bordj El Kiffan), by the age of five, both her parents had died, and it was her grandmother who raised her. At the age of eleven, Marguerite Caminat, a French woman residing in Algiers, stepped in as Baya's protector. While certain sources present Marguerite as Baya's “protector”, others state that Baya was responsible for completing household duties, much like a servant. Marguerite furnished her with a residence, art supplies, and words of support for her art.
In 1947 Marguerite, who was well connected in the literary and art worlds, was visited by the French art dealer Aimé Maeght who, later that year, presented Baya's work in a solo exhibition in his gallery. André Breton wrote the preface to the catalogue of Baya's exhibition.
After the time in Paris, Baya spent time in Vallauris working on pottery, where she met Picasso who was highly impressed by her work.
Baya returned to Algeria and in 1953 she married El Hadj Mahfoud Mahieddine, a famous musician, in an arranged marriage. She did not paint from 1953 to 1963, which coincides with the Algerian War. During these years she gave birth and was mothering six children.
In 1963 she resumed painting, exhibiting both new and old work in Algiers and in Paris, until her death on November 9, 1998.

Work 

In her gouaches dominated by vibrant colors, she often paints silhouettes of women and their clothes, belts and veils, figures of the enigmatic mother and different domestic objects.
The objects surrounding these ladies are devoid of any shadow.

Baya's artwork largely appear to reenact a vibrant and joyful community of women.

The vibrant colors and sinuous contours of the figures in her gouaches offer unique representations of flora and fauna, and portray unusual animals such as flying rabbits and camel-sized birds that might emerge from Scheherazade's stories, from "The Thousand and One Nights" Arab stories.

Reviews 
The bold colors and strange figures of her works revealed surrealist and dream-like qualities, which inspired artists such as Georges Braque and Pablo Picasso. André Breton defined her work as Surrealism, and this view was widely held for a long time.

Breton's enthusiastic reception and encomium of Baya and her work is expressed in his 1947 essay “Baya”:

“I speak not as others have, to deplore an ending, but rather to promote a beginning, and at this beginning, Baya is queen. The beginning of an age of emancipation and of agreement, in radical rupture with the preceding era, one of whose principal levers for man might be the systematic, always increasing impregnation of nature. The beginnings of this age lie with Charles Fourier, the new impetus has just been furnished by Malcolm of Chazal. But for the rocket that launches the new age, I propose the name Baya. Baya, whose mission is to reinvigorate the meaning of those beautiful nostalgic words: happy Arabia. Baya holds and rekindles the golden bough.”

Tribute 
In 2018, a Google Doodle was created to celebrate her 87th birthday.

References 

20th-century Algerian painters
20th-century ceramists
African potters
Algerian women painters
Algerian people of Berber descent
1931 births
1998 deaths
People from Algiers Province
20th-century women artists
Women potters
Algerian ceramists
Algerian women ceramists